This is an incomplete list of battles fought by the Ghurids.

( Color legend for the location of the battle )

References